Groupe Canal+ is a French mass media company. It is owned and controlled by Vivendi and has a film library in excess of 5,000 films. Vivendi has sold some parts of Canal+ to private investors which are still using the name of Canal+. It is headquartered in Issy-les-Moulineaux, in the suburbs of Paris.

The Wall Street Journal described Canal+ as "the French film industry's biggest financial backer, beloved by French cineastes".

It is a major source of finance for domestic film production, participating in the financing of the vast majority of films produced in France. It also  has its own subsidiary companies with direct involvement in film production.

StudioCanal, one of those subsidiaries, announced in 2011 that it would now spend €200 million a year on movie production, establishing its position as "the first port of call outside the U.S. for intelligent upmarket movies" such as Tinker Tailor Soldier Spy  which is fully financed by the studio.

Corporate divisions
 Canal+ – premium TV channel (Metropolitan France, Caribbean, Africa, Southern Pacific, Indian Ocean, Asia)
 Canal+ Cinéma – premium TV channel devoted to movies
 Canal+ Sport – premium TV channel devoted to sports programmes
 Canal+ Kids – premium TV channel devoted to family programming
 Canal+ Docs
 Canal+ Grand Écran
 Canal+ Foot
 Canal+ Séries – premium TV channel devoted to series
 Canal+ Sport 360 – premium TV channel, delayed broadcast of Sport from Canal+ 
 Ciné+ – set of six thematic cable television channels
 Clique TV – cable TV channel
 Comédie+ (formerly Comédie!) – cable TV channel devoted to humorous programs
 CStar Hits France – cable TV channel devoted to musical programs
 Foot+ – cable TV channel devoted to football
 Rugby+ – cable TV channel devoted to rugby football
 Golf+ – cable TV channel devoted to golf
 Infosport+ – cable TV news channel devoted to sports
 Piwi+ (formerly Piwi) – cable TV channel devoted to children programs
 Planète+ – cable TV channel devoted to documentaries
 Planète+ Adventure – cable TV channel devoted to documentaries from A&E Networks channels 
 Planète+ Crime– cable TV channel devoted to crime documentaries
 Polar+ – cable TV channel devoted to movies
 Seasons – cable TV channel devoted to documentaries
 Télétoon+ (formerly Télétoon) – cable TV channel devoted to animation
 Teletoon+ (formerly Minimax/ZigZap) – cable TV channel devoted to animation broadcast in Poland
 MiniMini+ (formerly MiniMini) – cable TV channel devoted to animated series for children from 3 to 8 years
 CNews (formerly i>Télé) – free-to-air news channel
 C8 – free-to-air channel
 CStar – free-to-air channel devoted to musical programs
 MyCanal – free streaming service for Canal+ subscribers to stream the channel's programming live and on-demand
 CanalPlay – on-demand service
 Canal+ International – international French premium channel featuring programming from Canal+ and its various other channels
 Canal+ Régie – advertising network for the group channel's and the cinema operator UGC 
 Canal+ (provider) – satellite TV provider
 M7 Group – television service provider based in Luxembourg
 Canal Digitaal (Netherlands)
 Direct One (Hungary)
 Focus Sat (Romania)
 HD Austria (Austria)
 Online.nl (Netherlands)
 Skylink (Czech Republic, Slovakia)
 Télésat (Belgium, Luxembourg)
 TV Vlaanderen (Flanders region in Belgium)
 StudioCanal – film producer and distributor
 StudioCanal Home Entertainment (North America, the United Kingdom and Ireland)
 SAM Productions ApS (Scandinavian)
 Arthaus (Germany)
 Red Production Company (United Kingdom)
 Tandem Productions (Germany)
 SPI International
 Dizi
 Film1
 FilmBox
 Kino Polska
 MediaBox Broadcasting International - themed television channels such as DocuBox, FashionBox, FightBox and FunBox.
 Stopklatka.pl
 Zoom TV
Formers Channels

Canal+ Hi-Tech

Canal+ Family

Canal+ Decale

Canal+ 3D

Canal+

Canal+ has operations in France, Poland, Vietnam and Myanmar, Rwanda and other world nations not yet listed through its flagship brand Canal+. It is encrypted for most of the day, and viewers who wish to watch the channel's more popular programming (new-release movies and live sport) must subscribe to the service.  Previously this involved the purchase of a decoder to decrypt the signal, but increasingly Canal+ is being offered as part of a multi-channel satellite or cable television package (known as CanalSat in France.).

Former operations
Canal Plus was the first cable TV channel to operate in Brazil, in 1989. It operated on the MMDS system and broadcast part of ESPN programming. Its Brazilian operations were sold to Grupo Abril in 1991.

Canal Plus came to the Nordic countries in 1997, acquiring the two FilmNet-channels and renaming them. The Nordic part was sold in October 2003 to the Telenor-owned Canal Digital, and the Canal+ brand was used under license until 2012, when the channels were re-branded C More Entertainment.

Canal+ has previously also been present in several other European countries; but as of 2016 it is only active in Poland and France.

Canal+ Hi-Tech was a private television channel in France dedicated to the broadcasting of films in 16:9 aspect ratio and HDTV 
Canal+ 16/9 changed its name to Canal+ Hi-Tech in March 2005. Through this change, the channel offered the latest technological advances in terms of image and sound, especially with high-definition programs. The channel was deleted when switching Canal+ to the 16:9 format.

Canal+ 3D was born on June 10, 2010, to broadcast some matches of the 2010 FIFA World Cup in 3D. It regularly broadcast films or sporting events of Canal+ in stereoscopic 3D format.

It stopped broadcasting on January 24, 2012.

StudioCanal

StudioCanal is a production company created in 1999, associated with NBCUniversal until 2011. Nowadays, StudioCanal is operating in several countries such as Germany, Japan, or Australia. For the movie industry, it is a major player at the European level.

Canal+ (provider)

Formerly Canal Satellite Numérique, a pay satellite and IPTV distributor (as CanalSAT DSL). Canal+ is a satellite TV package launched in 1992. A merger between CanalSat and TPS started in 2007, and finally canceled by the Competition Authority in 2011. With Canal+, the utilization of the card pairing (QEV) technology allow access to many channels such as, Eurosport, Paris Premiere or LCI.

M7 Group

M7 Group is a Luxembourg-based television provider which operates several direct broadcast satellite pay TV platforms: HD Austria in Austria, Télésat in Belgium and Luxembourg, TV Vlaanderen in the Flanders region in Belgium, Skylink in Czech Republic and Slovakia, Canal Digitaal in the Netherlands, Focus Sat in Romania, and Direct One in Hungary. It also operates a terrestrial pay television platform in Flanders, Belgium and offers B2B multimedia services. Canal+ acquired M7 Group for 1.1 billion euros on 12 September 2019.

Thema
Thema is a Canal+ Group company that oversees distribution of Pay TV services in various countries, and is the parent company of channels including Novelas TV and Nollywood TV. Thema was founded in 2005 by François Thiellet, and acquired by Canal+ in 2014.

International versions
As Canal+ was launched in new markets the brand has been used in several countries. When launching additional channels the channels were usually given colour-coded names, such as Canal+ Blue, Canal+ Green, Canal+ Yellow and Canal+ Red. Many of these subsidiaries have been sold and as of 2016, only the Polish Canal+ is partially owned by French Canal+.
Canal+ Spain, now known as #0. Launched in 1990 in Spain by Sogecable as an analogue pay channel, similar to the French and Polish version. In 2015 The largest Spanish telecommunications company Telefónica received the approved and closed the acquisition of Canal+, now renamed Movistar+.
Canal+ Flanders, became Canal+ when FilmNet was bought. Later sold and is now known as Play More (Telenet, a subsidiary of Liberty Global).
Canal+ Belgium, now known as BeTV. It shares many common programs with the French channels. It is owned by VOO, a public telco in Wallonia.
Canal+ Netherlands, FilmNet was rebranded as Canal+ in 1997. Canal+ sold the channels later on. In 2005, the channels were bought by Liberty Global and renamed them to Sport1 and Film1 in February 2006. Sport1 changed its name to Ziggo Sport Totaal in November 2015, Film1 was sold to Sony Pictures Television in the same year. On 1 May 2019, Sony announced that Film1 would close on 1 August 2019. However it was sold to SPI International instead.
Canal+ Poland, the channel is called Canal+ Premium, the satellite platform CANAL+ Polska
Canal+ Scandinavia, launched as Canal+ in 1997 with the integration of the FilmNet channels. The company was sold and renamed C More Entertainment, although the brand Canal+ was still used. It was purchased by the SBS Broadcasting Group in 2005, which was merged with ProSiebenSat.1 Media in 2007. In 2008, an agreement was made to sell the channels to TV4 Group. Since 2012 it is called C More.
Tele+ Digitale, the Italian branch sold in 2003 to News Corp. and fused with Stream TV, the direct competitor. Now, it is called Sky Italia.
Premiere, a German premium television channel and platform launched in 1990, was founded by Canal+, Bertelsmann and Kirch. A few years later, Canal+ sold its share of Premiere. It is now known as Sky Deutschland and is owned by the UK's Sky plc.
Movie Network, an Australian premium television service launched in 1995, was founded as a partnership between Canal+, HBO (a subsidiary of Time Warner), The Walt Disney Company, MGM/UA and Village Roadshow. A few years later, Canal+ dropped out from the partnership.
Canal+ Brazil, a Brazilian version created in 1989, not the own version, retransmission of American ESPN. Ended transmissions due to launch of the Brazil cable providers in 1991.
In May 2009, K+ founded by Canal+ and VTV was launched. K+ brings national level satellite TV service and OTT service to Vietnamese households, offering five premium and exclusive channels, up to 170 SD channels and HD channels across genres: sports, movies, general entertainment, news, music, and documentaries. 
Canal+ Afrique, launched as Canal Horizons in 1990, is the channel in Africa.
Canal+ Myanmar, originally launched by Forever Group as 4TV in 2006, it became a joint venture with Canal+ Group in 2017, and was rebranded as Canal+ in February 2018.
Canal+ Ethiopia, launched in 2021.

References

External links
Canal+ Group
Canal+ Overseas

 
Mass media companies established in 1983
Television production companies of France
Film production companies of France
Television networks in France
French-language television networks
Vivendi subsidiaries
Mass media in Paris